Breeze Song Gao is a shopping mall in Xinyi District, Taipei, Taiwan that opened on 24 October 2014. Its target customer group is young people aged 16 to 30. There are 126 stores in the mall, with the first H&M store introduced in Taiwan. In 2019, the first Kura Sushi store in Xinyi District was introduced.

History
The original location is the Xinyi store planned to be opened by Momo department store, which is in the same building as the Humble House Taipei. In August 2013, the Fubon Group resold the management rights of the mall to Breeze Group due to the poor investment of Momo department store Xinyi store, and Breeze took over the lease of Fubon Life A10.

Gallery

See also
 List of tourist attractions in Taiwan
 List of shopping malls in Taipei
 Breeze Center
 Breeze Nan Jing

References

External links

2014 establishments in Taiwan
Shopping malls in Taipei
Shopping malls established in 2014